The 2016 Brasil Open was a tennis tournament played on outdoor clay courts. It was the 16th edition of the Brasil Open, and part of the ATP World Tour 250 series of the 2016 ATP World Tour. It took place from February 22 through February 28, 2016, in São Paulo, Brazil.

Singles main-draw entrants

Seeds 

1 Rankings as of February 15, 2016.

Other entrants 
The following players received wildcards into the main draw:
 Guilherme Clezar
 Thiago Monteiro
 Benoît Paire

The following players received entry from the qualifying draw:
 Facundo Bagnis
 Gastão Elias
 Máximo González
 Blaž Rola

The following player received entry as a lucky loser:
 Roberto Carballés Baena

Withdrawals
Before the tournament
  Fabio Fognini (abdominal strain) → replaced by  Daniel Gimeno Traver
  Guido Pella (non medical)→replaced by  Luca Vanni

Retirements
  Pablo Andújar (right elbow injury)
  Horacio Zeballos (dehydration)

Doubles main-draw entrants

Seeds 

1 Rankings are as of February 15, 2016.

Other entrants 
The following pairs received wildcards into the main draw:
 Nicolás Almagro /  Eduardo Russi Assumpção
 Rogério Dutra Silva /  João Souza
The following pair received entry as alternates:
 Pedro Bernardi /  Guilherme Clezar

Withdrawals
Before the tournament
  Marcel Granollers (lower back injury)

Champions

Singles 

  Pablo Cuevas def.  Pablo Carreño Busta 7–6(7–4), 6–3

Doubles 

  Julio Peralta /  Horacio Zeballos def.  Pablo Carreño Busta /  David Marrero 4–6, 6–1, [10–5]

External links 
Official website